Sakarya University, frequently referred to simply as SAU, is a public research university located in the city of Serdivan, the capital of the Turkish province of Sakarya.

Considered one of the largest universities in Turkey with more than 85,000 students, Sakarya University has very high research activity and its comprehensive graduate program offers doctoral degrees in Science, Technology, Engineering, and Humanities, as well as professional degrees in business, medicine, law, nursing, social work and dentistry. It hosts five different institutes: Educational Sciences, Natural Sciences, Health Sciences, Social Sciences, and Middle East Institute.

In Turkey, Sakarya University is the first and only state university receiving the ISO-2002 Quality Certificate and "the EFQM Excellence Quality Certificate of Competency Level".

History 

The nucleus of Sakarya University, whose mission is to educate individuals by all kinds of equipment modern civilization requires, has been formed by School of Engineering and Architecture founded in 1970 affiliated with Istanbul Technical University. This school has turned into the State Academy of Engineering and Architecture in 1971 and served as a faculty from 1982 to 1992.

Founded as Sakarya Engineering and Architecture in 1970, it was renamed to Sakarya State Engineering and Architecture Academy in 1971. It started Master of Science and Doctorate of Philosophy (PhD) programs in 1980. The programs were executed by İTÜ (Istanbul Technical University) Institute of Pure and Applied Sciences. It was bounded to Istanbul Technical University as Sakarya Engineering Faculty in 1982. Vocational Schools of Sakarya and Düzce were bounded to her at same year. Finally It left from ITÜ and became Engineering Faculty of Sakarya University in 1992. Düzce Vocational School left from Sakarya Engineering Faculty and bounded to Abant Izzet Baysal University at the same year. Finally, Sakarya University was established according to the Law No. 3837 dated 3 July 1992.

As one of the universities established in the 1990s, Sakarya University has set a good example due to not only its success in completion of academic units and technical infrastructure but its advances in laboratories, educational and social services, internet infrastructure and informatics as well.

List of faculties 
 Faculty of Engineering
It is the first and founding faculty of Sakarya University. Originally established as “Sakarya School of Engineering and Architecture” in 1970, the school was named as “Sakarya Faculty of Engineering” in 1992. It includes eight different departments, Mechanical Engineering, Civil Engineering, Electrical Electronics Engineering, Industrial Engineering, Metallurgical and Materials Engineering, Environmental Engineering, Geophysical Engineering, and Food Engineering.

 Faculty of Computer and Information Sciences
 Faculty of Business
 Faculty of Education
Established in 1997, the Faculty of Education sustains its academic activity in Hendek Campus. It is the largest faculty locating outside of the main campus.

 Faculty of Political Sciences
Originally established as Faculty of Economic and Administrative Sciences in July 1992, the faculty was reorganized under the name Faculty of Political Sciences in May 2014 including five different departments, Political Science and Public Administration, International Relations, Economics, Labor Economics and Industrial Relations, Public Finance, and Financial Econometrics.

 Faculty of Technical Education
 Faculty of Medicine
 Faculty of Arts and Sciences
 Faculty of Fine Arts
Established in 1997, the faculty hosts three departments as Painting, Ceramics and Traditional Turkish Handicrafts.

 Faculty of Dentistry
 Faculty of Law
 Faculty of Theology
Established in 1992, it is located outside of the main campus. With its more than 80 academic staff, Faculty Of Theology provides undergraduate and graduate education to around 3500 students.

 Faculty of Communication
Established in 2012, it hosts four departments, Public Relations and Advertising, Journalism, Radio-Television and Cinema and Communication Sciences.

 Faculty of Management
 Faculty of Sport Sciences
 Faculty of Technology
The Faculty of Technology has opened its door to the students since the academic year 2010-2011 and there are currently five engineering departments in the faculty:  Civil Engineering, Electrical and Electronics Engineering, Mechanical Engineering, Mechatronics Engineering, Metallurgical and Materials Engineering.
The education and teaching methods of the Faculty of Technology differ from other faculties. The faculty practices 7+1 educational model which is based on university-industry collaboration. One of the purposes of this model is to help its undergraduate students to become as an engineer with good practical skills. In this model students take theoretical and applied courses and before graduation students have a chance to practice their theoretical knowledge in the related field of the industry.

For this purpose the curriculum is set as: Theoretical and applied courses for 7 semesters, application in the industrial corporations for 1 semester.

 Faculty of Tourism

The Sakarya University Library 
Sakarya University Library comprises nearly 10 individual libraries. Of them, the Suleyman Demirel Library is the largest single library in the Sakarya University Library System, and is one of the largest buildings on the campus. In 1995, the Suleyman Demirel Library moved into its current building, which covers a 7000 m2 section and it is located in an area of 5000 m2. In 2014, an additional building was opened, containing many study spaces, and reading rooms.

The Sakarya University Library, together with faculty libraries and vocational school libraries, have more than 710,000 pieces of information source (more than 700,000 books, 7.620 thesis papers, 3.717 CDs and DVDs) and 1.766 printed journals in total. In the classification of the books and journals, Dewey Classification System is utilized. It is also possible to use inter library loan facility when required. Through electronic database subscriptions, a through electronic access to numerous books and journals, and two-century-old archive of renowned journal, “Time”, has also been made possible to users.

Sakarya University hosts also Ibn-i Haldun Library located at the building of the Middle East Institute. Hosting books mostly on Middle Eastern  politics, society and culture, this library provides basic materials for graduate student and academic researchers. Added to this Middle East-focused library, libraries in the Faculty of Theology and Faculty of Education host area-focused reading materials.

International Programs and LLP/Erasmus 
Sakarya University is one of the leading Turkish universities for its international exchange programs. It allows a wide number of students to go on their education at different universities of Europe. Owing to academic agreements with more than 20 countries, Sakarya University hosts students from different countries of Europe, America, Africa, Asia and Far East.

Sakarya University is also one of the most successful few universities for exchange number of Erasmus students in Turkey.

Life at university

Transportation
Sakarya is located near Istanbul, the biggest city in Turkey. It takes approximately 2–3 hours to travel from Istanbul Atatürk Airport to Sakarya. Sakarya is easy to reach from other cities by the help of both buses and trains which are available at any time.

Sakarya University is located on the edge of the city, approximately 10 kilometers from the Sakarya bus terminal and 5 kilometers from city center. Bus companies provide complimentary free shuttle services between the bus terminal and the university campus. Alternatively, you could ride with city buses (minibuses, and public buses) or take a cap (yellow taxis) to get to the university campus.

From the city center, public buses and other minibus services make it possible for students to get to the campus and other units of the university. Within the border of university campus, all public transports are free of charge.

Catering services
In the main campus, all the catering services are handled by the Office of Cafeterias and Canteens. Academic staff, managerial staff and students are all served from the same kitchen. In line with the ISO 9000-9002 standards, the food served is exposed to strict hygienic controls and issue of nutrition is always taken into consideration. 5000-6000 people are served on a daily basis in the main campus.

Dormitories
In and around the campus are located a number of state and private dorms which consider all types of requirements of students in terms of accommodation. Each dorm has its own laundry, dining hall and library. The capacity of the dorms is as follows:

SAU Esentepe Dormitory: 550
General Directorate of Higher Education Credit and Hostels Institution: 2,000
Hendek General Directorate of Higher Education Credit and Hostels Institution: 800

Health services
Health services are carried out under the control and guidance of the Health-Cultural and Sports Affairs Office. The aim of the services organized is to provide necessary health services for the students and staff members and their families in the main campus. The center has two clinics, one emergency room, two dental rooms and one laboratory. The X ray facilities are also available in the center. Four GPS, two dentists, one gynaecologist, seven nurses and one lab technician serve in the center.

Students clubs
Under the counselling of experienced staff, 31 clubs of different interests such as computer, chess, theatre and tourism. Students are encouraged to have student clubs of their interests so that they can improve themselves intellectually and socially.

Sports activities
Sports activities are categorized into two groups. At the school, there is the Rectorate Cup Competition, and secondly the games organized with other universities. Both organisations are carried out with the collaboration of the lecturers of Sports and Physical Education Faculty. The Rectorate Cup Organisation holds a yearly football tournament as well as other competitions in chess, basketball and athletics. The university teams have gained degrees in various competitions. Aiming at the top in the areas of sports, the university is prepared to complete the sports complexes soon. These are a football pitch, a tennis court and a swimming pool.

Other activities
Every year, the university holds a traditional Spring Festival on 16–18 May, which marks the meeting of natural beauty of the campus with social facilities. The festival has already turned out a carnival where all residents of Sakarya can take part and enjoy the culture and sport events. Many international projects help the school host a number of foreign students and researchers and let them better understand cultural life and study the Turkish language, enabling them to form close relationships with Turkish society and manners.

Notable former faculty
 Malik Beyleroğlu (Sports) - Silver medalist at the 1996 Summer Olympics
 Abdullah Gül, former President of Turkey (2007-2014) - Taught management courses at the Sakarya University Engineering Faculty, which later became the Sakarya University in 1992
 Sabahattin Zaim - one of the most influential scholars on Islamic economics
 Engin Yıldırım - member of Constitutional Court of Turkey
 Norman Finkelstein - American academic, author of The Holocaust Industry
 Sami Güçlü - former Minister of Agriculture and Rural Affairs
 Burhanettin Duran - the general director of the Foundation for Political, Economic and Social Research

References

External links

Official website 
Official website 

 
1970 establishments in Turkey
Adapazarı
Buildings and structures in Sakarya Province
Educational institutions established in 1970